Yegyi Township is a township of Kyonpyaw District in the Ayeyarwady Region of Myanmar.

Ngathinechaung Sub-Township consists of the northwestern portions of the township.

Localities 

 Kya Khat Hmyaung

Gallery

See also
List of villages in Yegyi Township

References

Townships of Ayeyarwady Region